Josh Freed is a Canadian writer, director and actor.

He has won two Chris Awards for Best North American Current Affairs Documentary. In Canada, Freed has been nominated for three Gemini Awards, three Writers Guild of Canada Awards and a Genie Award.

He writes a weekly humour column in The Gazette. He received two National Newspaper Awards for best Canadian columnist in 1997 and 2002.

Early life
Freed was born and raised in Montreal and grew up on De L’Épée Avenue. Being Jewish, he attended Protestant schools because Catholic schools did not accept Jewish students at the time.

Bibliography
1980: Moonwebs: Journey into the Mind of a Cult
1983: The Anglo Guide to Survival in Québec
1990: Sign Language and Other Tales of Montreal Wildlife
1996: Vive le Québec Freed!
1997: Fear of Frying...and Other Fax of Life
1999: 2000 Reasons to Hate the Millennium
2000: Press 1 and Pray...and Other Letters from Voice Jail

The events described in the 1980 book inspired the award-winning movie Ticket to Heaven and led to the creation of Info-Cult.

Filmography

As director
1991 : North to Nowhere (TV)
1993 : Paradise Lost (TV)
1994 : Escaping from History
1995 : Merchandising Murder
1995 : The Last Train
2000 : Selling the Water
2000 : Polar Bear Safari
2002 : Juggling Dreams (TV)
2003 : To Kill or to Cure (TV)
2004 : In Search of Sleep: an Insomniac’s Journey (TV)
2006 : China’s Sexual Revolution (TV)
2008 : My Messy Life (TV)
2010 : Where Did I Put My Memory? (TV)

As a writer
1988 : A Song for Quebec
1992 : Between the Solitudes
1997 : Magic Time
2000 : Selling the Water
2000 : Polar Bear Safari
2002 : Juggling Dreams (TV)

As an actor
1981 : Ticket to Heaven

References

External links
 
JoshFreed.ca

Canadian columnists
Writers from Montreal
Male actors from Montreal
Anglophone Quebec people
Living people
Montreal Gazette people
Year of birth missing (living people)
Jewish Canadian journalists